Tehran International Tower is a 56-story residential tower in Tehran, Iran. It is the tallest residential building in Iran, and the only one to meet the definition of a skyscraper.

It is located north of Yusef Abad and Amir Abad districts, close to Kurdistan and Qasem Soleimani Expressway.

Specifications 

The Tehran International tower consist of walls and ceilings of reinforced concrete. It has a concrete wall core along the middle, where the three wings of the building extend, each going out 120 degrees from each other. The walls have a subsidiary design and the main walls are perpendicular. The design of the tower is based on safety standards and retaining walls have been implemented. The tower has an Intelligent control system including internal computer network, energy management, network control, CCTV cameras, fire systems, control systems and traffic control.

The Tehran International Tower was built in three separate wings.

See also
List of tallest buildings in Tehran

References 

Skyscrapers in Iran
Towers in Iran
Buildings and structures in Tehran
Buildings and structures completed in 2007
Residential skyscrapers